The 1974 Nova Scotia general election was held on 2 April 1974 to elect members of the 51st House of Assembly of the Province of Nova Scotia, Canada. It was won by the Liberal Party.

Results

Results by party

Results by region

Retiring incumbents
Liberal
James L. Connolly, Halifax Chebucto
Ralph F. Fiske, Pictou Centre
A. Lloyd MacDonald, Pictou East
George Riley, Halifax Cobequid

Progressive Conservative
Gerald Doucet, Richmond
Floyd MacDonald, Queens
George Isaac Smith, Colchester
Victor Thorpe, Kings North
Maurice L. Zinck, Lunenburg East

Nominated candidates
Legend
bold denotes party leader
† denotes an incumbent who is not running for re-election or was defeated in nomination contest

Valley

|-
|bgcolor=whitesmoke|Annapolis East
|
|Hank De Boer2,58343.48%
||
|Gerry Sheehy3,13452.76%
|
|Murray A. Bent2233.75%
|
| 
||
|Gerry Sheehy
|-
|bgcolor=whitesmoke|Annapolis West
||
|Peter M. Nicholson2,63653.00%
|
|J.R. Kerr2,15043.22%
|
|David N. Lowe1883.78%
|
|
||
|Peter M. Nicholson
|-
|bgcolor=whitesmoke|Clare
||
|Benoit Comeau2,95961.07%
|
|Vincent L. Doucet1,21825.14%
|
|Jean L. Belliveau66813.79%
|
|
||
|Benoit Comeau
|-
|bgcolor=whitesmoke|Digby
||
|Joseph H. Casey3,52565.90%
|
|John R. Nichols1,59029.73%
|
|C.B. Haight2344.37%
|
|
||
|Joseph H. Casey
|-
|bgcolor=whitesmoke|Hants West
||
|Robert D. Lindsay4,14848.07%
|
|Ron Russell3,70742.96%
|
|Gary E. Tonks7748.97%
|
|
||
|Robert D. Lindsay
|-
|bgcolor=whitesmoke|Kings North
||
|Glenn Ells3,53649.39%
|
|David J. Waterbury3,12443.63%
|
|George W. Graves5006.98%
|
|
||
|Victor Thorpe†
|-
|bgcolor=whitesmoke|Kings South
|
|Edgar K. Aston1,99933.11%
||
|Harry How3,57659.22%
|
|John P. O'Meara4637.67%
|
|
||
|Harry How
|-
|bgcolor=whitesmoke|Kings West
||
|Frank Bezanson5,03158.34%
|
|Kathleen E. Howlett3,20637.23%
|
|Donald Wolsey3744.34%
|
|
||
|Frank Bezanson
|}

South Shore

|-
|bgcolor=whitesmoke|Lunenburg Centre
|
|James Kinley3,87839.08%
||
|Bruce Cochran4,08641.18%
|
|Ralph E. Deamond4214.24%
|
|Walton Cook1,53815.50%
||
|Walton Cook
|-
|bgcolor=whitesmoke|Lunenburg East
|
|Joseph Saunders1,96341.06%
||
|Ron Barkhouse2,53653.04%
|
|Anthony W.E. Zinck2825.90%
|
|
||
|Maurice L. Zinck†
|-
|bgcolor=whitesmoke|Lunenburg West
||
|Maurice DeLory3,63554.92%
|
|Ella Spence2,64339.93%
|
|William R. Griswold3415.15%
|
|
||
|Maurice DeLory
|-
|bgcolor=whitesmoke|Queens
|
|R. Keith Wyer2,64940.58%
||
|John Wickwire2,90544.50%
|
|A.J. d'Entremont97414.92%
|
|
||
|Floyd MacDonald†
|-
|bgcolor=whitesmoke|Shelburne
||
|Harold Huskilson4,11947.58%
|
|Ron Hatfield3,73243.11%
|
|Dewey Waybret8069.31%
|
|
||
|Harold Huskilson 
|-
|rowspan=2 bgcolor=whitesmoke|Yarmouth 
||
|Fraser Mooney8,09832.87%
|
|Martin Cottreau4,02916.35%
|
|Lawrence Dukeshire6372.59%
|
| 
||
|Fraser Mooney
|-
||
|Hugh Tinkham7,06828.69%
|
|George A. Snow4,30017.45%
|
|Leslie Babin5042.05%
|
|
||
|George A. Snow
|}

Fundy-Northeast

|-
|rowspan=2 bgcolor=whitesmoke|Colchester
||
|Melinda MacLean9,51425.87%
|
|Gerald Ritcey7,18219.53%
|
|Eda Forsythe1,5154.12%
|
|Bob Kirk1590.43%
||
|Gerald Ritcey
|-
||
|Floyd Tucker8,66223.55%
|
|Ron Giffin7,97421.68%
|
|Allan Marchbank1,7714.82%
|
|
||
|George Isaac Smith† 
|-
|bgcolor=whitesmoke|Cumberland Centre
||
|Guy Brown2,28352.16%
|
|Raymond M. Smith1,60136.58%
|
|Elory Tabor49311.26%
|
|
||
|Raymond M. Smith
|-
|bgcolor=whitesmoke|Cumberland East
|
|Ronald S. MacNeil3,49040.82%
||
|Roger Stuart Bacon4,12548.25%
|
|David W. D'Aubin93410.93%
|
|
||
|Roger Stuart Bacon
|-
|bgcolor=whitesmoke|Cumberland West
|
|W.J. Brown2,20545.86%
||
|D. L. George Henley2,32348.32%
|
|A. Bradley Colpitts2805.82%
|
|
||
|D. L. George Henley
|-
|bgcolor=whitesmoke|Hants East
||
|Jack Hawkins3,32249.88%
|
|Avard Ettinger2,69040.39%
|
|Clair White5498.24%
|
|John G. Stanhope Sr.991.49%
||
|Jack Hawkins
|}

Halifax/Dartmouth/Eastern Shore

|-
|bgcolor=whitesmoke|Halifax Atlantic
|
|Darrell E. Wentzell4,38035.90%
||
|John Buchanan6,22951.06%
|
|Colin Campbell1,59113.04%
|
|
||
|John Buchanan
|-
|bgcolor=whitesmoke|Halifax Chebucto
||
|Walter Fitzgerald5,60853.47%
|
|Dennis Ashworth3,23330.82%
|
|Burris Devanney1,64815.71%
|
|
||
|James L. Connolly†
|-
|bgcolor=whitesmoke|Halifax Citadel
||
|Ronald Wallace4,29948.73%
|
|Richard MacLean3,07134.81%
|
|Michael Bradfield1,45216.46%
|
|
||
|Ronald Wallace 
|-
|bgcolor=whitesmoke|Halifax Cobequid
||
|George Doucet8,69149.57%
|
|Silvia Hudson6,87839.23%
|
|George C. Cann1,96411.20%
|
|
||
|George Riley† 
|-
|bgcolor=whitesmoke|Halifax Cornwallis
||
|George M. Mitchell5,39147.52%
|
|George T.H. Cooper3,83333.79%
|
|Muriel Duckworth2,12118.70%
|
|
||
|George M. Mitchell
|-
|bgcolor=whitesmoke|Halifax Eastern Shore
||
|Alexander Garnet Brown6,43752.90%
|
|Hanson D. Josey4,20534.56%
|
|John T. Kennedy1,52712.55%
|
|
||
|Alexander Garnet Brown
|-
|bgcolor=whitesmoke|Halifax Needham
||
|Gerald Regan4,36461.49%
|
|James H. Vaughan1,85426.12%
|
|Martin Dolin87912.39%
|
|
||
|Gerald Regan
|-
|bgcolor=whitesmoke|Halifax-St. Margaret's
||
|Leonard L. Pace7,23847.87%
|
|George C. Piercey6,08440.24%
|
|Richard Rogers1,79811.89%
|
|
||
|Leonard L. Pace
|-
|bgcolor=whitesmoke|Dartmouth North
||
|Glen M. Bagnell7,09151.41%
|
|Richard L. Weldon4,83935.08%
|
|Joseph Bouchard1,86313.51%
|
|
||
|Glen M. Bagnell
|-
|bgcolor=whitesmoke|Dartmouth South
|
|D. Scott MacNutt5,87144.24%
||
|Roland J. Thornhill6,49148.91%
|
|Norman H. Dares9086.84%
|
|
||
|D. Scott MacNutt 
|}

Central Nova

|-
|bgcolor=whitesmoke|Antigonish 
||
|Bill Gillis5,14156.88%
|
|Ronald A. MacDonald3,17235.09%
|
|Patrick D. Gough7268.03%
|
|
||
|Bill Gillis 
|-
|bgcolor=whitesmoke|Guysborough
||
|A.M. "Sandy" Cameron3,68855.66%
|
|Fenwick MacIntosh2,65240.02%
|
|William Sugg2864.32%
|
|
||
|A.M. "Sandy" Cameron
|-
|bgcolor=whitesmoke|Pictou Centre
|
|Lawrence MacKinnon4,95442.54%
||
|Fraser MacLean5,10043.80%
|
|Dave MacKenzie1,59113.66%
|
|
||
|Ralph F. Fiske†
|-
|bgcolor=whitesmoke|Pictou East
|
|J. Lester MacLellan2,94542.09%
||
|Donald Cameron3,21745.98%
|
|Joanne E. Kohout83511.93%
|
|
||
|A. Lloyd MacDonald†
|-
|bgcolor=whitesmoke|Pictou West
||
|Dan Reid2,62443.99%
|
|Harvey Veniot2,60243.62%
|
|Charles Parker73912.39%
|
|
||
|Harvey Veniot
|}

Cape Breton

|-
|bgcolor=whitesmoke|Cape Breton Centre
|
|Albert J. Boudreau1,70321.76%
|
|Mike Laffin2,74335.05%
||
|Buddy MacEachern3,38043.19%
|
|
||
|Mike Laffin
|-
|bgcolor=whitesmoke|Cape Breton East
|
|Vincent Kachafanas3,44330.83%
|
|Frederick Adshade1,61114.43%
||
|Jeremy Akerman5,92953.10%
|
|Archie MacDonald1831.64%
||
|Jeremy Akerman
|-
|bgcolor=whitesmoke|Cape Breton North
|
|Barry LeBlanc4,15533.57%
||
|Tom MacKeough4,88939.50%
|
|Len J. Arsenault3,33326.93%
|
|
||
|Tom MacKeough
|-
|bgcolor=whitesmoke|Cape Breton Nova
|
|Ronald DiPenta1,27517.19%
|
|Percy Gaum2,33431.46%
||
|Paul MacEwan3,80951.35%
|
|
||
|Paul MacEwan
|-
|bgcolor=whitesmoke|Cape Breton South
||
|Vince MacLean6,48750.87%
|
|John Francis Burke3,72129.18%
|
|Earl Johnston2,44119.14%
|
|Angus Currie1020.80%
||
|John Francis Burke 
|-
|bgcolor=whitesmoke|Cape Breton West
||
|Allan Sullivan6,28153.46%
|
|Kenneth Andrews3,19927.23%
|
|Frank Boone2,26919.31%
|
|
||
|Allan Sullivan
|-
|rowspan=2 bgcolor=whitesmoke|Inverness
||
|William MacEachern5,60626.50%
|
|Norman J. MacLean4,83222.84%
|
|Donald MacKay621>br>2.94%
|
|Catherine M. Haig1390.66%
||
|Norman J. MacLean
|-
||
|John Archie MacKenzie5,40325.54%
|
|Joseph Shannon4,08819.32%
|
|Winston Bennett4662.20%
|
|
||
|John Archie MacKenzie
|-
|bgcolor=whitesmoke|Richmond
||
|Gaston LeBlanc3,69757.62%
|
|Joseph Stewart2,13833.32%
|
|Stanley Pashkoski5819.06%
|
|
||
|Gerald Doucet†
|-
|bgcolor=whitesmoke|Victoria
||
|Maynard MacAskill2,57359.44%
|
|Fisher Hudson1,54235.62%
|
|Colin A. Gillis2144.94%
|
|
||
|Fisher Hudson
|}

References

Further reading
 

1974
1974 elections in Canada
1974 in Nova Scotia
April 1974 events in Canada